The Avengers (Original Motion Picture Soundtrack) is the film score for the Marvel Studios film The Avengers composed and conducted by Alan Silvestri. It was released by Hollywood Records on May 1, 2012. A separate soundtrack and concept album, titled Avengers Assemble (Music from and Inspired by the Motion Picture), by various artists was also released on the same date.

The Avengers (Original Motion Picture Soundtrack)

In November 2011, Marvel announced that Alan Silvestri, who scored Captain America: The First Avenger, would write and compose the score for The Avengers (making him the first composer to score more than one movie in the Marvel Cinematic Universe). Silvestri stated, "This is actually a very unique experience [for me]. I’ve worked on films where there have been a number of stars and certainly worked on films where there have been characters of equal weight in terms of their level of importance and profile in the film, but this one is somewhat extreme in that regard because each of these characters has their own world and it's a very different situation. It's very challenging to look for a way to give everyone the weight and consideration they need, but at the same time the film is really about the coming together of these characters, which implies that there is this entity called the Avengers, which really has to be representative of all of them together." Silvestri recorded the score with the London Symphony Orchestra at Abbey Road Studios in London, England. Avengers director Joss Whedon described the score as "old school", saying "the score is very old-fashioned, which is why [Silvestri] was letter perfect for this movie because he can give you the heightened emotion, the [Hans Zimmer] school of 'I’m just feeling a lot right now!' but he can also be extraordinarily cue and character specific, which I love." Silvestri reprises his themes from Captain America: The First Avenger, and introduced new ones - including the theme for Black Widow, which is "a lonely, plucked theme with an Eastern European flavor to define this character". The score album was released on May 1, 2012.

Track listing

Simultaneously with the digital release, the album was physically released by Hollywood Records, Marvel Music, and Intrada Records. Several tracks on this release are longer than on the digital album and there is one additional track, "Interrogation".

Avengers Assemble (Music from and Inspired by the Motion Picture)

In March 2012, American alternative rock band Soundgarden announced through their official Facebook page that they had written a song to be included on the film's soundtrack, entitled "Live to Rise". The song was released on April 17, 2012, as a free digital download during its first week of availability in the iTunes Store. Additionally, Indian rock band Agnee released a music video for their single "Hello Andheron", which served as the theme song for the Indian release of the film. The following day, Marvel released the album's full track listing, which was released by Hollywood Records on May 1, 2012. A cover of AC/DC's song "Shoot to Thrill", performed by Theory of a Deadman, was originally to be included on the album, but was removed for unknown reasons.

Track listing

None of these songs, with the exception of "Live to Rise," are heard in the film.

Charts

References

External links
Music video of "Live to Rise"
Music video of "Comeback"

2012 soundtrack albums
2010s film soundtrack albums
Avengers (film series)
Marvel Cinematic Universe: Phase One soundtracks
Rock soundtracks
Hard rock soundtracks
Intrada Records soundtracks
Alan Silvestri soundtracks
Marvel Music compilation albums
Hollywood Records compilation albums